Puthia is an Upazila of Rajshahi District in the Division of Rajshahi, Bangladesh.

Geography
It has 30484 households and total area 192.64 km2. This is a historical & traditional place in Bangladesh for Puthia Rajbari & Shiva Temple Complex.

Demographics
According to 2011 Bangladesh census, Puthia had a population of 207,490. Males constituted 50.64% of the population and females 49.36%. Muslims formed 93.93% of the population, Hindus 5.27%, Christians 0.48% and others 0.33%. Puthia had a literacy rate of 49.58% for the population 7 years and above.

As of the 1991 Bangladesh census, Puthia has a population of 342,405. Males constitute 51.16% of the population, and females 48.84%. This Upazila's eighteen up population is 81679. Puthia has an average literacy rate of 25.5% (7+ years), and the national average of 32.4% literate.

Administration
Puthia Upazila is divided into Puthia Municipality and six union parishads: Baneshwar, Belpukuria, Bhalukgachhi, Jeopara, Puthia, and Silmaria. The union parishads are subdivided into 128 mauzas and 183 villages.

See also
Upazilas of Bangladesh
Districts of Bangladesh
Divisions of Bangladesh
Puthia Temple Complex
Puthia Rajbari (palace)
Pancha Ratna Govinda Temple

References

External links
 Official website 

Upazilas of Rajshahi District